Agudas Israel may refer to:
Agudas Israel (Latvia), a political party in Latvia during the 1920s and 1930s
World Agudath Israel, the political arm of Ashkenazi Haredi Judaism
Agudat Yisrael, a political party representing the ultra-Orthodox population of Israel
Agudath Israel of America, a Haredi Jewish communal organization in the United States
Agudas Israel Housing Association, a British housing association